This is a list of awards and nominations received by EXID, a South Korean girl band formed in 2012 by Yedang Entertainment. On January 8, 2015, 35 months after their official debut, the band received their first number-one win on South Korean music program M Countdown with the digital single "Up & Down."

Awards and nominations

References

EXID
Awards and nominations